Mount Harkness is a mountain,  high, standing  south of the Organ Pipe Peaks and forming part of the east wall of Scott Glacier, in the Queen Maud Mountains of Antarctica. It was discovered in December 1934 by the Byrd Antarctic Expedition geological party under Quin Blackburn, and named at that time by Rear Admiral Richard E. Byrd for Bruce Harkness, a friend of Richard S. Russell, Jr., a member of that party.

References

Mountains of the Ross Dependency
Gould Coast